Paul Kohl (12 November 1894 – 17 December 1959) was a German racing cyclist. He won the German National Road Race in 1924.

References

External links

1894 births
1959 deaths
German male cyclists
Cyclists from Berlin
German cycling road race champions
20th-century German people